Lundbreck is a hamlet in southern Alberta, Canada within the Municipal District of Pincher Creek No. 9.

It is part of Census Division No. 3 and the federal riding of Macleod.

History 
Lundbreck was incorporated in 1907, celebrated its centennial in 2007, and was named for two coal miners (Lund and Breckenridge).

Lundbreck started out as a coal mining town, quickly growing to a size of about 1,000 people until the coal mines closed, at which time it quickly shrank.

Demographics 

Education 
Livingstone School is a K-12, 1A school that was instituted in 1955, as a more modern alternative to the then practice of using several small, one room, multiple grade, rural schools.  Kids were bussed in from the local area rural schools from Cowley and the northwest portion of the M.D. of Pincher Creek No. 9.

See also 
List of communities in Alberta
List of designated places in Alberta
List of former urban municipalities in Alberta
List of hamlets in Alberta

Notable people
Valentine Milvain

References 

Hamlets in Alberta
Designated places in Alberta
Former villages in Alberta
Municipal District of Pincher Creek No. 9
Latter-day Saint settlements in Canada